Budyonnivskyi District is an urban district of the city of Donetsk, Ukraine, named after Marshal of the Soviet Union Semyon Mikhailovich Budyonny.

It was created in 1980 out of the Proletarskyi, Kirovskyi and Leninskyi districts. The district's name was a revival of the original name of Proletarskyi District.

External links
Budyonny Raion at the Mayor of Donetsk website
 Budyonny Raion at the Uzovka website

Urban districts of Donetsk
Soviet toponymy in Ukraine